Santa Claus is a town in Spencer County, Indiana, United States, in the southwestern part of the state.  Located in Carter, Clay and Harrison Townships, it sits between Interstate 64 and the Ohio River and Owensboro. The population was 2,481 at the 2010 census, making it the largest community in Spencer County.

The town was established in 1854 and known as Santa Fe. In 1856, when the town was working to establish a post office, the Post Office Department refused their first application as there was already a Santa Fe, Indiana established with the Post Office Department. Several town meetings were held, during which the name Santa Claus was selected.

The town has the world's only post office to bear the name of the eponymous Christmas figure. Because of this popular name, the post office receives thousands of letters to Santa from all over the world each year. A group of volunteers known as Santa's Elves ensures each child receives a reply from Santa Claus; this tradition has been in existence since at least 1914. Every year, the post office also creates a special Christmas hand-cancellation pictorial postmark for use during December, which also attracts mail from all over the world. The pictorial postmark is chosen each year from submissions from art students at nearby Heritage Hills and South Spencer High Schools.

Santa Claus has grown substantially since the 1990 census, which recorded 927 residents. A majority of Santa Claus residents live within the gated community of Christmas Lake Village, which was developed in the late 1960s by Bill Koch. It consists of  developed around three lakes: Christmas Lake, Lake Holly, and Lake Noel. The street names in Christmas Lake Village are all named after the Christmas season. Many residents also live in Holiday Village, a subdivision on the north side of town.

Santa Claus is the home to numerous themed attractions including: Santa's Candy Castle, Santa Claus Museum, Holiday World & Splashin' Safari, Frosty's Fun Center, Christmas Lake Golf Course, and Santa's Stables. It is also home to Santa's Lodge and Lake Rudolph Campground & RV Resort.

History

The community of Santa Claus was established in 1849. The story of how it received the name of Santa Claus has roots both in fact and legend. In January 1856, the town applied for a post office to be installed. They submitted their application under the name of Santa Fe. The application was returned to them with the message, "Choose some name other than Santa Fe." The process of settling upon the name of Santa Claus has been lost to legend. There are many different versions of the story and there were other choices as well that the town did not settle upon. What is known is that in 1856, the name of Santa Claus was accepted by the Post Office Department.

On June 25, 1895, as part of a nationwide standardization for place names (see United States Board of Geographic Names), the post office name was changed to the one word Santaclaus. The town's unique name went largely unnoticed until the late 1920s, when Postmaster James Martin began promoting the Santa Claus postmark. The name was changed back to Santa Claus on February 17, 1928. It was then that the Post Office Department decided there would never be another Santa Claus Post Office in the United States, due to the influx of holiday mail and the staffing and logistical problems this caused. The growing volume of holiday mail became so substantial that it caught the attention of Robert Ripley in 1929, who featured the town's post office in his nationally syndicated Ripley's Believe It or Not! cartoon strip.

The town's name also inspired Vincennes, Indiana entrepreneur Milt Harris to create Santa's Candy Castle, the first tourist attraction in Santa Claus, Indiana. Dedicated December 22, 1935 and sponsored by the Curtiss Candy Company, the red-brick Candy Castle is purported to be the first themed attraction in the United States. Another Santa Claus Town attraction, Toy Village, features a series of miniature fairytale buildings sponsored by prominent national toy manufacturers. Santa Claus Town led to the creation of the town's first newspaper, The Santa Claus Town News, and the Santa Claus Chamber of Commerce.

Harris' project caught the attention of a rival entrepreneur, Carl Barrett, the Chicago head of the Illinois Auto Club. Disliking what he called Harris' materialism, Barrett planned his own tourist attraction, Santa Claus Park. The statue was promoted as being solid granite, although it was subsequently revealed to be concrete when cracks formed years later.

Years of lawsuits between Harris and Barrett were costly distractions for the two entrepreneurs. The lawsuits centered around land ownership and went all the way to the Indiana Supreme Court. National news media covered the ongoing story of "Too Many Santas." Over the years, both entrepreneurs' visions became neglected as the development of the town spread west due to land development by the Koch Family.

On August 3, 1946, retired industrialist Louis J. Koch opened Santa Claus Land, which is claimed to be the world's first theme park. The park's name was changed to Holiday World in 1984. In 1993, it became Holiday World & Splashin' Safari when a water park named Splashin' Safari was added to the park. Still owned and operated by the Koch family, it attracts more than one million visitors annually, and it is home to The Voyage, which has repeatedly been voted by coaster enthusiasts as the number one wooden roller coaster in the world.

More recently the development of Christmas Lake Village as a gated community has more than doubled the population of Santa Claus. In 2005, a local development company purchased Santa's Candy Castle and other buildings that comprised Santa Claus Town and announced plans to restore and re-open them to the public, starting with Santa's Candy Castle on July 1, 2006. The 40-ton, 22-foot concrete Santa Claus statue was restored in 2011. And in 2012, a local historic church and the town's original post office were moved to the site next to the large Santa Claus statue.

Geography

Demographics

2010 census
As of the census of 2010, there were 2,481 people, 936 households, and 737 families residing in the town. The racial makeup of the town was 98.1% White, 0.3% African American, 0.1% Native American, 0.5% Asian, 0.6% from other races, and 0.4% from two or more races. Hispanic or Latino of any race were 1.3% of the population.

There were 936 households, of which 37.3% had children under the age of 18 living with them, 70.1% were married couples living together, 6.7% had a female householder with no husband present, 1.9% had a male householder with no wife present, and 21.3% were non-families. 18.1% of all households were made up of individuals, and 7.6% had someone living alone who was 65 years of age or older. The average household size was 2.65 and the average family size was 3.00.

The median age in the town was 39.8 years. 27.7% of residents were under the age of 18; 4.3% were between the ages of 18 and 24; 24.9% were from 25 to 44; 28.3% were from 45 to 64; and 15% were 65 years of age or older. The gender makeup of the town was 47.9% male and 52.1% female.

2000 census
As of the census of 2000, there were 2,041 people, 732 households, and 620 families residing in the town. The racial makeup of the town was 99.22% White, 0.44% Asian, 0.20% from other races, and 0.15% from two or more races. Hispanic or Latino of any race were 0.69% of the population.

There were 732 households, out of which 39.6% had children under the age of 18 living with them, 79.0% were married couples living together, 4.1% had a female householder with no husband present, and 15.2% were non-families. 12.2% of all households were made up of individuals, and 4.0% had someone living alone who was 65 years of age or older. The average household size was 2.79 and the average family size was 3.05.

In the town, the population was spread out, with 29.3% under the age of 18, 5.0% from 18 to 24, 32.2% from 25 to 44, 24.3% from 45 to 64, and 9.2% who were 65 years of age or older. The median age was 35 years. For every 100 females, there were 95.3 males. For every 100 females age 18 and over, there were 94.6 males.

The median income for a household in the town was $60,388, and the median income for a family was $61,991. Males had a median income of $44,514 versus $24,050 for females. The per capita income for the town was $23,957. About 1.0% of families and 1.2% of the population were below the poverty line, including 1.3% of those under age 18 and none of those age 65 or over.

Prior census
As the town wasn't incorporated until after the 1960 census and that it covers two townships (Carter and Clay); it is not possible to ascertain the population by "piecing together" the census datum of the 1850-1960 census returns.

New route for US-231

The Indiana Department of Transportation built a new route for U.S. Route 231, which placed that highway within  of Santa Claus. Local officials are touting the new highway as a major tool to draw new economic development.

In keeping with the Christmas theme of the town, Indiana 162, the main highway through town (which connects to the new U.S. 231), is known as Christmas Boulevard.

Notable people
Jay Cutler  former NFL quarterback for Denver Broncos, Chicago Bears, and Miami Dolphins
Arad McCutchan  former college basketball coach for the University of Evansville

References in popular culture
The town was featured in a RadioShack national television commercial in 2008.
In December 2010, the town museum was involved in a Coca-Cola Christmas project called Santa's Forgotten Letters.
 In December 2011, the town was named one of the World’s Top Christmas Destinations by Forbes magazine.
 The town was featured in the 2017 Lifetime TV Christmas movie Snowed-Inn Christmas.
 The town was featured on Christmas Day 2020 as part of HGTV's "Holiday 2020" Lineup

See also
 Christmas Island, Australia
 Santa Claus, Arizona
 Santa Claus, Georgia
 Santa's Workshop (Colorado)
 North Pole, Alaska
 North Pole, New York
 Santa Claus Village, Finland
 Noel, Missouri
 Christmas, Michigan
 Christmas, Florida
 Bronner's Christmas Wonderland

References

External links

Official website for the Spencer County Visitors Bureau

Santa Claus
Towns in Spencer County, Indiana